Peter Jeffery is an American musicologist.

Life
Jeffery graduated from the Fiorello H. LaGuardia High School of Music and Art, and the Performing Arts, in New York City, and from Brooklyn College of the City University of New York, and from Princeton University with a Ph.D. in Music History in 1980.

He taught at Harvard University, the University of Delaware, and Princeton University, and was in 2014 a professor at the University of Notre Dame.

Lawsuit
On January 25, 1997, Jeffery took his 12-year-old son to a Smashing Pumpkins concert at the New Haven Coliseum in New Haven, Connecticut.  He initially planned to wait in a "parents room" but found it was in use by a warm-up act.  He joined his son in the concert hall.  It was the first rock concert he had attended.  Although he wore ear plugs, at the close of the concert his left ear was ringing.  He filed a lawsuit against the band, opening acts Fountains of Wayne and The Frogs, Virgin Records, the Coliseum, the city of New Haven, the ear-plug manufacturer, and the vendor he purchased the ear plugs from.

Awards
 1985 Alfred Einstein Award of the American Musicological Society
 National Endowment for the Humanities, research grant
 1987 MacArthur Fellows Program

Works
Re-envisioning Past Musical Cultures: Ethnomusicology in the Study of Gregorian Chant, University of Chicago Press, 1995,  
Ethiopian Christian Chant: an Anthology (1993–97, coauthored with Kay Kaufman Shelemay), the three-volume, A-R Editions, Inc., 1993, 
The Study of Medieval Chant: Paths and Bridges, East and West, Editors Kenneth Levy, Peter Jeffery, Boydell & Brewer Ltd, 2001, 
The Secret Gospel of Mark Unveiled: Imagined Rituals of Sex, Death, and Madness in a Biblical Forgery, Yale University Press, 2007,  
Translating tradition: a chant historian reads Liturgiam authenticam, Liturgical Press, 2005,

References

External links
Website
"Letter from Peter Jeffery", Journal of the American Musicological Society, Vol. 49, No. 1 (Spring, 1996), pp. 175–179

American musicologists
Living people
Musicians from New York City
Brooklyn College alumni
Harvard University faculty
University of Delaware faculty
Princeton University faculty
MacArthur Fellows
Fiorello H. LaGuardia High School alumni
Year of birth missing (living people)
Date of birth missing (living people)